Boronia tetragona is a species of plant in the citrus family, Rutaceae, and is endemic to a small area of the southwest of Western Australia. It is an erect, glabrous, perennial herb with simple, sessile leaves and pink, four-petalled flowers.

Description
Its stems are more or less square in cross-section with a smooth, sharp rib on each corner. There are smooth, dark red bracts at the base of the flowers. The eight stamens have warty glands near the tip. Flowering occurs from October to December.

Taxonomy and naming
Boronia tetragona was first formally described in 1998 by Paul Wilson and the description was published in Nuytsia from a specimen collected by Gregory John Keighery near Busselton. Wilson derived the specific epithet (tetragona) from the Greek words tetra meaning "four" and gona meaning "angle", referring to the four-sided branches. Other sources give tessares (τέσσαρες) and gōnia (γωνία) as the Greek words for 
"four" and "angle".

Distribution and habitat
This boronia grows in open woodland sometimes with sedges, between Capel and the Whicher Range in the Jarrah Forest and Swan Coastal Plain biogeographic regions.

Conservation
Boronia tetragona is classified as "Priority Three" by the Government of Western Australia Department of Parks and Wildlife, meaning that it is poorly known and known from only a few locations but is not under imminent threat.

References

tetragona
Flora of Western Australia
Plants described in 1998
Taxa named by Paul G. Wilson